Phidiana militaris is a species of sea slug, an aeolid nudibranch, a marine gastropod mollusc in the family Aeolidiidae.

Distribution
This species was described from India. It has been reported from Oman, New Zealand, Hong Kong, Thailand, Borneo and the Philippines. In 2016 three specimens of this species were observed eating hydroids on a sunken submarine in Haifa Bay off Israel, probably having reached the Mediterranean as a Lessepsian migrant through the Suez Canal from the Red Sea.

References 

Facelinidae
Gastropods of New Zealand
Gastropods described in 1864